The 38th AVN Awards officially the 38th AVN Awards presented by MyFreeCams.com was a pornography awards ceremony held on January 23, 2021. The 38th edition of the ceremony which began in 1984 encompassed 120 categories involving content creation, production, retail and web/tech forums in the adult industry. Due to the ongoing global COVID-19 pandemic the ceremony was held virtually and streamed on Adult Video News' AVNStars.com.

Show overview

Production 
In July 2020 it was announced the award ceremony and related events typically held in Las Vegas would instead be held virtually due to the ongoing pandemic. “The health and safety of our attendees and exhibitors is our top priority, so out of an abundance of caution we’ve made the difficult decision to not hold our January events in-person, but instead create a digital experience that will give industry professionals and the fans of adult entertainment unique opportunities to interact online,” said Tony Rios, chief executive officer of AVN Media Network. The award ceremony was held January 23, the AVN Adult Entertainment Expo was also held on the AVN Stars platform the leading up to the ceremony. As well as the GayVN Awards was held the 18th of January exclusively on the GayVN Stars website.

Hosts 
On January 8, 2021, adult performers Kira Nior and Skyler Lo were announced as co-hosts for the show.

Winners and nominees

Major awards 
Winners in bold.

References

External links 
 

AVN Awards
2020 film awards
2021 awards in the United States
Pornographic film awards
Pornography
Virtual events